Another is a Japanese mystery horror novel by Yukito Ayatsuji, published on October 29, 2009 by Kadokawa Shoten. The story focuses on a boy named Kōichi Sakakibara who, upon transferring into Yomiyama Middle School and meeting the curious Mei Misaki, finds himself in a mystery revolving around students and people related to his class falling victim to gruesome, senseless deaths.

A manga adaptation by Hiro Kiyohara was serialized between May 2010 and January 2012 in the issues of Kadokawa Shoten's Young Ace. Both the novel and the manga have been licensed in North America by Yen Press. A 12-episode anime television series produced by P.A. Works aired in Japan between January 10 and March 27, 2012, with an original video animation episode released on May 26, 2012, and a live-action film of the same name was released in Japanese theatres on August 4, 2012.

Plot
In 1972, Misaki, a popular student of Yomiyama North Middle School's class 3-3, suddenly died partway through the school year. Devastated by the loss, the students and teacher of class 3-3 continued to behave as though Misaki was still alive, leading to a strange presence shown within the graduation photo. In Spring 1998, Kōichi Sakakibara transfers into Yomiyama's class 3-3, where he meets Mei Misaki, a quiet student whom their fellow classmates as well as the teacher seemingly ignore. The class is soon caught up in a strange phenomenon, in which students and their relatives begin to die in often peculiarly gruesome ways. Realizing that these deaths are related to the long deceased "Misaki of 1972", a yearly calamity that has struck most every class 3-3 since 1972, Kōichi and Mei seek to figure out how to stop it before it kills anymore of their classmates or them.

Characters

Main characters

Played by: Kento Yamazaki (live-action film)
A 15-year-old boy who transferred to Yomiyama North Middle's Class 3-3 from Tokyo in 1998, but was hospitalized due to  pneumothorax before the school year began. Kōichi stays with his grandparents and aunt Reiko, while his father conducts research in India. He befriends Mei Misaki despite warnings against doing so, and works with his classmates to uncover the truth behind the curse of Class 3-3.

Played by: Ai Hashimoto (live-action film)
An unusual girl who wears a white eyepatch over her left eye, Kōichi first meets her on the elevator of Yūmigaoka Hospital, as she is going to deliver a doll to her "poor other half" in the second basement (it comes out in bits that her other half is deceased, her cousin, and later is revealed to be her twin sister in episode 0). At school, she is completely ignored by her classmates. When Kōichi goes out of his way to try to interact with her, she warns him not to, but relents and gradually opens up to him about her situation after Kōichi is also ignored by the class. She reveals to Kōichi that her left eye is a doll's eye, and that she has a special ability, noting later in the story that she is able to see the "color of death", that is, identify people who are dead and those close to death.

Kōichi's relatives

Kōichi's widowed father and Reiko's brother-in-law, is a college professor who is doing research in India. He regularly calls his son to chat, but does not give much detail about their family background, opting instead to complain about the heat. The phone connection typically becomes filled with static and drops just as Yōsuke might say something informative.

Kōichi's mother and Reiko's older sister, she died 15 years ago right after giving birth to him. She was a student in Yomiyama Middle School's Class 3-3 back in 1972, and was thus one of Misaki Yomiyama's classmates. It is later revealed that she died while Reiko was in Class 3-3; and was therefore a victim of the curse that year.

Played by: Ai Kato (live-action film)
Kōichi's aunt and Ritsuko's younger sister. She has been hanging out with Koichi at the grandparents home while Koichi's dad has been away. At the beginning of the story, she gives him advice about Yomiyama Middle School through a series of "rules". She usually returns home exhausted after work. She was in class 3-3 15 years ago when Koichi's mother died. It is later revealed that she is also , the Class 3-3's assistant homeroom teacher, and that the fourth rule she gave Koichi was to separate their home life from their school life; thus, Kōichi addresses her as Reiko at home and Ms. Mikami at school. During the events of Koichi's summer camp trip, Mei discovers and Koichi realizes that Reiko has been the Casualty, that is, the spirit who triggers the deaths of those in class 3-3 or their relatives. Her back story shows that she was Class 3-3's homeroom teacher two years ago, but that she had drowned.

Mei's relatives

 
She is an artist and the owner of "Blue Eyes Empty to All, In the Twilight of Yomi", a ball-jointed doll store and museum. Kōichi later confirms she is Mei Misaki's adoptive mother, but they have a somewhat distant relationship where they talk to each other like strangers. Mei reveals that her mother had a stillbirth 12 years ago, which made her obsessed with dolls; this hobby has led to her and Mei treating each other as strangers.

First introduced as Mei's "other half" and later as her cousin, she was the person whom Mei was delivering a present to at the basement of Yūmigaoka Hospital, where Kōichi learns houses the memorial chapel. In reality, she is Mei's twin sister, raised separately after birth, though they occasionally met each other.  Has a more cheerful personality than Mei. Misaki and Mei's biological mother is named Mitsuyo. Misaki died in the hospital from leukemia in April.

The receptionist at the doll shop and museum. Whenever she sees Kōichi, she offers him a student-discounted admission to their museum. Mei later reveals that she is her grand-aunt.

Yomiyama North Middle School

Class 3-3 students

, Takashi Waka (live-action film)
He's one of the class delegates and a glasses-wearing honor student. He and Teshigawara are childhood friends.

, Maya Okano (live-action film)
The class 3-3 representative for the girls side. Her appearance is friendly. In May, when she learns that her mother died in a car accident, she ends up falling down the stairs and impaling her neck on the sharp end of her umbrella.

, Kiyotaka Uji (live-action film)
A classmate who befriends Kōichi, whom he nicknames "Sakaki". His appearance is a little taller than other boys and cheery. A sports lover with a superficial personality, he was asked to explain the situation to Kōichi but has trouble going through with it.

, Kai Inowaki (live-action film)
A schoolmate and member of the Art Club. He along with Teshigawara help Kōichi unravel the 3-3 calamity. Kōichi thinks he has a crush on Ms. Mikami, the assistant homeroom teacher, as he often inquires as to her health and whereabouts.

, Ayana (live-action film)
One of the students of 9 Grade Class 3 in 1998. She is friends with Takako Sugiura and Izumi Akazawa in her duties as the head of countermeasures, acting as her right and left hands. She is a kind and shy person. The deaths of her brother Atsushi and Aya makes her lose her mind and sanity. In the anime, she tries to kill Mei, believing her to be an extra student, but she falls down from the second floor and breaks her neck. In the manga, she briefly appears talking with Mei; and in the novel, she always stays in the company of Izumi's group. She survives the curse in these adaptions. In the live-action film, she appears in some scenes and doesn't speak a lot, and later she survives the Inn incident.

, Mika Akizuki (live-action film)
A student in charge of countermeasures, she devises and upholds means to deal with the calamity of Class 3-3. She replaces her friend Yukari as the class representative on the girls side in June. She resents Mei and Kōichi for breaking the class rule of not interacting with the person who is "not there", feeling that their actions have undermined the countermeasures and have caused the deaths to continue. In the novel, during the summer trip, she is pursued by Mineko Numata, and dies from falling off a veranda and breaking her neck. In the manga and anime, her hair is styled in bunches. In the afterword of the manga series, Ayatsuji wrote that Akazawa was a supporting character in the novels, but that manga artist Kiyohara give her a bigger role, which worked well for the climax and the big twist in the adaptation.

, Mana Konno (live-action film)
A student of 9th Grade Class 3 in 1998. She is friends with Yumi Ogura and Izumi Akazawa as the countermeasures's personal right-arm. She is a young girl and cares deeply about her friends. She has a crush on Junta in the anime. She used to attend the same school with Mei's twin sister, which made her believe that Mei is the extra student. Junta's death makes her lose her mind; she tries to kill Mei, but gets stuck in the cables and dies. In the manga, she dies in the fire; and in the novel, she is killed by Mineko. In the live-action film, she survives these encounters, and is protected by Tomohiko.

A classmate who is noted to occasionally miss school because of his weak heart condition. His appearance is thin and a bit smaller than other boys. He is usually seen sitting at the sidelines during P.E. In June, he suffers a fatal heart attack.

He appears to have a crush on Akazawa, which is what drives his decision to participate in the summer trip, during which he died, making him one of the seven "Deaths of August".

A member of the kendo club. He died during the summer trip when he was stabbed by Takabayashi's grandmother from the back, he's one of the seven "Deaths of August".

He is a ranked A student in class. He died during the summer trip, one of the seven "Deaths of August".

Faculty

Class 3-3 homeroom teacher. In July, after realizing that the countermeasures to the Class 3-3 calamity are not working, he kills his bedridden mother by smothering her with a pillow the night before stabbing himself in the neck in front of the class.

, Yoshihiko Hakamaka (live-action film)
Reiko describes him as the "ruler" of the secondary library. He typically dresses in all black. He was the teacher for Class 3-3 in 1972, the year Misaki Yomiyama died. Some years later, he resigned as a teacher but stayed on as librarian, claiming that he was "running away [from the curse]" but, staying nearby out of guilt. Since then, he's kept a record of the phenomena, the deceased and their connections; and shares his findings with Kōichi and Mei.

Others

The honor student from Yomiyama Middle School's Class 3-3 in 1972. He was extremely popular and well-liked by her peers and teachers. He died in a house fire that also claimed the lives of both his brother and his family. His classmates were so heartbroken by his untimely death and could not accept it, that at school they pretended as if he was still alive, which led to a mysterious photo with the supposedly dead Misaki in it.

, Hiroko Sato (live-action film)
A nurse at Yūmigaoka Hospital who befriends Koichi. A running gag is that she is accident-prone. She has a younger brother named Takeru in Class 3-3. She tries to assist Kōichi in unraveling the mystery of Yomiyama North by giving him information she gleans from discussions with her colleagues and her brother. In June, she is killed when the elevator she was riding on breaks its cable and falls down the shaft; the impact causes the ceiling beam to fall on her.

A former Yomiyama North Middle School student from Class 3-3 of 1983, and one of Reiko's classmates. During their summer trip, when he had killed a classmate, he discovers that the other people in the class suddenly have no knowledge of that classmate. He realizes he had killed the Casualty, making this the only known case of the phenomenon stopping halfway through the year. He recorded his theories and confession on an audio cassette and hid it in the school for future students to find. After graduation, he moved to Tokyo to pursue his studies. He became a banker, but quit after a few years, returning to Yomiyama to help with the family business. He is a regular at Inoya Cafė, where Tomoka Inose works.

Yūya's older half-sister. A waitress at Inoya Cafė, she attended Yomiyama North Middle School during 1983, though she was not part of Class 3-3. Although aware of the rumors about said class, she did not believe them until Yūya, fearing for his life, explained the situation to her. Katsumi Matsunaga is a regular at the cafe where she works.

Ikuo Takabayashi's grandmother. A gentle warm-hearted grandmother, though she proved to be an insane crone murderer due to Ikuo's death. In the novel, she is responsible for the murder of Manabu Maejima, Izumi Akazawa, Takako Sugiura, Junta Nakao, Shigeki Yonemura, and her husband Kensaku during the summer trip. She then proceeded to commit suicide by biting off her tongue, making her along with her husband one of the seven "Deaths of August".  In the anime, she is not directly responsible for Sugiura's or Akazawa's death, and she was killed with a frying pan by Izumi, saving Yūya Mochizuki and Naoya Teshigawara.

Media

Novels
Another is a 487-page novel written by Yukito Ayatsuji. The novel was originally serialized in Kadokawa Shoten's literary magazine Yasai Jidai in intermittent periods between the August 2006 and May 2009 issues. A compiled tankōbon volume was published on October 29, 2009 and a two-volume bunkobon edition was released on September 25, 2011. A re-release of the bunkobon edition featuring illustrations by Noizi Ito was released under the imprint Sneaker Bunko on March 1, 2012. A spin-off novel titled Another: Episode S/0 was released on July 31, 2013.  It is two novels in one binding. Another S is a side novel set in the same time period, an adventure of Mei Misaki during summer vacation. Another 0 is set during Aunt Reiko's year in class 3-3, in 1983. Yen Press has licensed the novels in North America, and released Another in 2013 digitally, and in October 2014 in print. Another: Episode S/0 was released in May 2016. The English translation is by Karen McGillicuddy.

A sequel, titled Another 2001, was serialized in Yasei Jidai magazine from the November 2014 issue to the February 2020 issue, and as its name implies, takes place in 2001. A compiled volume was released on September 30, 2020. Yen Press also licensed the sequel novel and released it on December 13, 2022.

Manga
A manga adaptation illustrated by Hiro Kiyohara was serialized between the May 2010 and January 2012 issues of Kadokawa Shoten's Young Ace magazine. Four tankōbon volumes were released between October 4, 2010 and December 29, 2011. A "0th" volume of the manga was released on May 26, 2012, compiling two extra chapters published in Young Ace on December 28, 2011 and February 3, 2012. Yen Press has licensed the original four-volume manga in North America and released it as an omnibus.

Anime

A 12-episode anime television series adaptation produced by P.A. Works and directed by Tsutomu Mizushima aired in Japan between January 10 and March 27, 2012. The screenplay was written by Ryō Higaki, and the chief animation director Yuriko Ishii based the character design used in the anime on Noizi Ito's original concept art. The music was produced by Kow Otani, and the sound director is Yoshikazu Iwanami. The anime has two theme songs: the opening theme  by the band Ali Project, and the ending theme "Anamnesis" by Annabel. Sentai Filmworks licensed the series in North America, releasing it on BD/DVD on July 30, 2013. An original video animation (OVA) episode set before the beginning of the series was released on May 26, 2012 with a "0th" volume of the manga. MVM Films released the series, including the OVA, in the United Kingdom and Ireland in late 2013.

Live-action film

A live-action film adaptation of the same name, directed by Takeshi Furusawa and produced by Kadokawa Pictures was released in Japanese theaters on August 4, 2012.

Reception
The novel ranked third in both the 2010 Honkaku Mystery Best 10 and the Kono Mystery ga Sugoi! 2010 mystery fiction guide books. It was nominated for the 2010 Honkaku Mystery Award.

On June 12, 2015, the now-defunct Chinese Ministry of Culture listed Another among 38 anime and manga titles banned in China.

Editions
Novel
 

Another manga volumes story by Yukito Ayatsuji, art by Hiro Kiyohara.
Original Japanese version published by Kadokawa Shoten. English version by Yen Press.

Notes

References

External links
  at Kadokawa Shoten 

2012 anime television series debuts
2000s horror novels
2009 Japanese novels
2010 manga
2014 Japanese novels
Abandoned buildings and structures in fiction
Bandai Namco franchises
Fiction about cemeteries
Fiction about curses
Fiction about memory erasure and alteration
Fiction about monsters
Fiction about murder
Fiction about urban legends
Fiction set in 1972

Fiction set in 1998
Fiction set in 2001
Fiction set in 2006
[[Category:Fiction set in 2008]
Horror anime and manga
Hospitals in fiction
Japanese horror novels
Japanese mystery novels
Japanese novels adapted into films
Japanese serial novels
Kadokawa Dwango franchises
Kadokawa Shoten manga
Manga adapted into films
Mystery anime and manga
Novels about death
Novels about suicide
Novels set in Japan
Novels set in high schools and secondary schools
P.A.Works
Paranormal novels
Fiction set in prison
Fiction about sacrifices
School life in anime and manga
Seinen manga
Sentai Filmworks
Supernatural thriller anime and manga
Television censorship in China
Television shows set in Japan
Works banned in China
Yen Press titles